Sándor Csányi (born 19 December 1975) is a Hungarian actor.

Csányi aimed to be an actor from an early age and was admitted into the University of Theatre and Film Arts in Budapest on his fourth attempt. In 2002, he became a member of the Radnóti Theatre in Budapest.

His earliest film role was lending his voice for the 1999 film Sitiprinc and he followed this up by starring in shorts Az Ember, akit kihagytak and uristen@menny.hu (god@heaven.hu) the following year. He then had small roles in a number of films until 2003 when he starred in Nimród Antal's critically acclaimed Kontroll. He has since become somewhat of a leading man in Hungarian cinema, starring in such films as Just Sex and Nothing Else, Rokonok and Children of Glory.

He was married to Hungarian actress Lia Pokorny who he has worked alongside on a number of films. They have one child, Michael (2003).

Filmography
 Sitiprinc (1999) ...Horváth Rudolf (voice)
 uristen@menny.hu (god@heaven.hu) (1999) ...Thief
 Jadviga párnája (2000) ...Rosza Pali
 This I Wish and Nothing More (2000)...Strici
 Pizzaman (2001) ...Portás 2
 Nexxt (2001) ...Balfék
 I Love Budapest (2001) ...Miki
 Citromfej (2001) ...Constructor
 Szent Iván napja (2003) ...Misi
 A Bus Came... (2003) ...Miklós
 Kontroll (2003) ...Bulcsú
 Magyar vándor (2004) ...Tartar messenger
 The Unburied Man (2004)
 Stop Mom Theresa (2004) ...David
 The Porcelian Doll (2005) ...Csurmándi
 A Fény ösvényei (2005) ...Alex
 Az Igazi Mikulás (2005) ...Dr. Lápossy
 Just Sex and Nothing Else (2005) ...Tamás
 Rokonok (2006) ...István Kopjáss
 Children of Glory (2006) ...Tibi Vámos
 Idegölő (2006) ...The gas-man
 S.O.S. Love! (2007) ...Péter
 Nosedive (2007) ...Cameo
 Chameleon (2008) ...Márk
 Adventure (2011)
 Coming Out (2013)
 Eternal Winter (2018) ...Rajmund

References

External links
 

1975 births
Living people
Hungarian male stage actors
Hungarian male film actors
Male actors from Budapest
20th-century Hungarian male actors
21st-century Hungarian male actors